The name Gordon has been used for ten tropical cyclones world-wide.

In the Atlantic Ocean, Gordon has been used five times since 1988, when it replaced the name Gilbert on the list of hurricane names:
 Hurricane Gordon (1994) – killed 1,122 in Haiti, and 23 in other nations. Damage in the United States was $400 million, and damage in Haiti and Cuba was severe.
 Hurricane Gordon (2000) – formed near Guatemala, cut across the Yucatán Peninsula and later hit Florida as a tropical storm. Killed 23 in Guatemala and one in Florida, and $10.8 million damage there (no figure for Guatemala).
 Hurricane Gordon (2006) – formed in the central North Atlantic, tracked north and east while becoming a Category 3 major hurricane. Crossed the Azores as a Category 1 storm before dissipating over western Europe.
 Hurricane Gordon (2012) – a strong Category 2 hurricane which passed over the eastern Azores as a Category 1.
 Tropical Storm Gordon (2018) – formed near the Florida Keys and affected South Florida, killing two. Then made landfall west of the Alabama-Mississippi border as a strong tropical storm, causing moderate damage.

In the western Pacific  Ocean, Gordon was used four times:
Tropical Storm Gordon (1979) (T7910, 07W, Herming) – Strong tropical storm which made landfall in China.
Typhoon Gordon (1982) (T8216, 16W) – Category 3 typhoon with no known effects on land.
Tropical Storm Gordon (1985) (T8527, 24W) – Weak tropical storm which made landfall in Vietnam.
Typhoon Gordon (1989) (T8908, 08W, Goring) – Powerful Category 5 super typhoon which crossed northern Luzon at peak intensity before making landfall southwest of Hong Kong as a strong tropical storm. 306 people were killed by Gordon, and 120,000 were left homeless in the Philippines.

In the South Pacific Ocean, Gordon has been used once: 
 Cyclone Gordon (1979)

Atlantic hurricane set index articles
Pacific typhoon set index articles
South Pacific cyclone set index articles